Antiplanes habei is a species of sea snail, a marine gastropod mollusk in the family Pseudomelatomidae.

Description

Distribution
This marine species occurs in the Okhotsk Sea and off Honshu, Japan

References

 Kantor, Yu I., and A. V. Sysoev. "Mollusks of the genus Antiplanes (Gastropoda: Turridae) of the northwestern Pacific Ocean." The Nautilus 105.4 (1991): 119–146.

External links
 

habei
Gastropods described in 1991